The 2014–2015 MRF Challenge Formula 2000 Championship was the third running of the MRF Challenge Formula 2000 Championship. The championship commenced on 17 October 2014 in Losail International Circuit, Qatar and finished on 25 January 2015 in Madras Motor Racing Track, India. The series consisted of 12 races, spread across 3 meetings.

With four victories – two at Losail and two in Madras – and top-five finishes in every race, Toby Sowery finished the season as champion. Sowery finished 47 points clear of his next closest competitor Ryan Cullen, who was a three-time race winner, winning a pair of races in Bahrain and one in Madras. Third place in the championship went to the best placed home driver Raj Bharath, who was a race winner at Losail; he finished 26 points in arrears of Cullen. Four other drivers won races during the season; Tarun Reddy won the other race to be held at Losail, Struan Moore and Mathias Lauda each won races in Bahrain, and Oscar King won the season's final race, in Madras.

Drivers

Race calendar and results
The second round in Bahrain was held in support of the FIA World Endurance Championship.

Championship standings

References

External links
 

2014–2015
MRF Challenge
MRF Challenge
MRF Challenge
MRF Challenge
MRF Challenge